Finn's Point National Cemetery is a United States National Cemetery located in Pennsville Township, Salem County, New Jersey, United States. It encompasses , and as of February 2009, had 3,033 interments. Adjacent to Fort Mott, it is governed by the United States Department of Veterans Affairs  and administered by the Washington Crossing National Cemetery.

History 
Originally purchased by the federal government to build a battery to protect the port of Philadelphia, the land became a cemetery by 1863 for Confederate prisoners of war who died while in captivity at Fort Delaware. One hundred and thirty five Union soldiers who died while serving as guards at the prison camp are also buried here. The death toll among prisoners of war and the guards was high, especially in the latter part of 1863 and throughout 1864. Disease was rampant and nearly 2,700 prisoners died from malnutrition or neglect. Confederate prisoners interred at the cemetery totaled 2,436 and all are in a common grave as can still be seen as a huge pit in the north western corner of the site near the monument.

It was officially made a National Cemetery on October 3, 1875 by request of Virginia Governor James L. Kemper, who criticized the poor maintenance of the Confederate grave sites.

Finn's Point National Cemetery is north west of Supawna Meadows National Wildlife Refuge near Fort Mott State Park. The cemetery was placed on the National Register of Historic Places in 1978.

Serial killer Andrew Cunanan committed one of his murders at the cemetery on May 9, 1997, killing cemetery caretaker William Reese and stealing his truck.

Noteworthy monuments 

 The Union Monument, dedicated in 1879 to 135 Union soldiers who died while on duty at Fort Delaware.
 In the northwest corner, 13 white marble headstones mark the burial place of German prisoners of World War II who died while in custody at nearby Fort Dix, New Jersey.

Gallery

References

External links

 National Cemetery Administration
 Finn's Point National Cemetery
 Finn’s Point National Cemetery at Denkmalprojekt.org 
 
 
 

Cemeteries on the National Register of Historic Places in New Jersey
Historic American Landscapes Survey in New Jersey
1863 establishments in New Jersey
Cemeteries in Salem County, New Jersey
United States national cemeteries
Monuments and memorials in New Jersey
1875 establishments in New Jersey
National Register of Historic Places in Salem County, New Jersey
New Jersey Register of Historic Places
Pennsville Township, New Jersey
Historic districts on the National Register of Historic Places in New Jersey